Belle Isle State Park is located in  Lancaster County, Virginia, on the Rappahannock River. It sits between Deep Creek and Morattico Creek and is currently under public ownership. As of 2015, the yearly visitation was 44,502.

The park is a peninsula surrounded by Tidewater coastal marshes. Wildlife observed includes blue herons, osprey, hawks, bald eagles, white-tailed deer and various reptiles and amphibians. It is near the unincorporated towns of Litwalton, Morattico and Somers.

History
The park and Georgian style  mansion  were operated in the 19th century as a plantation. The property was acquired in 1692 by John Bertrand. Belle Isle mansion was built around 1760 by Raleigh Downman and restored in the 1940s. The architect for the restoration was Thomas Tileston Waterman, the first director of the Historic American Buildings Survey . Some of the interior rooms and paneling can be seen today at the Winterthur Museum in Delaware.  The house, which is surrounded by the park but still privately owned, was placed on the National Register of Historic Places in 1971. Bel Air, a colonial revival house on the grounds designed by Waterman, can be rented for overnight stays. In addition, there is a cottage that can also be rented.

Attractions
The park has a campground with RV lots, tent sites, and trailer rentals. A boat launch and rental boats are also available in the park. The trail system includes a mix of hiking-only and multi-use trails for hiking, biking, and horseback riding.

References

External links

 General Park Information
 More Park Info
 Bio of Thomas Waterman
History of house and removal of paneling to Winterthur

Parks in Lancaster County, Virginia
State parks of Virginia
Houses on the National Register of Historic Places in Virginia
Plantation houses in Virginia
Georgian architecture in Virginia
Houses in Lancaster County, Virginia
Houses completed in 1760
National Register of Historic Places in Lancaster County, Virginia